Jim T. Lindsey (February 1, 1926 – April 2, 2013) was an American politician.

Early life 
Born in Bowie County, Texas, Lindsey received his law degree from Baylor Law School and was in real estate.
Lindsey served in the Texas House of Representatives 1949-1957 as a Democrat and served as Speaker of the Texas House of Representatives from 1955 to 1957. He died in Redwood Valley, California.

Notes

1926 births
2013 deaths
People from Bowie County, Texas
Baylor Law School alumni
Texas lawyers
Businesspeople from Texas
Speakers of the Texas House of Representatives
Democratic Party members of the Texas House of Representatives
20th-century American businesspeople
20th-century American lawyers